Robert Kirkpatrick Simpson (1837 – 5 August 1921) was a member of the New Zealand Legislative Council from 14 July 1914 to 13 July 1921, when his term ended. He was appointed by the Reform Government.

He was from Marton, and he died at his home there on 5 August 1921.

References 

1837 births
1921 deaths
Members of the New Zealand Legislative Council
Reform Party (New Zealand) MLCs